(The anonymous letter) is a farce in one act composed by Gaetano Donizetti in 1822 to a libretto by , a former monk and the official censor of the Kingdom of the Two Sicilies.

With a letter of recommendation from his teacher Johann Simon Mayr, Donizetti was in Naples and, on 12 May 1822, came to an agreement to write the opera with the impresario Domenico Barbaja, for whom he had already produced La zingara (The Gypsy Girl). Six weeks later he presented the new farce to the public, the premiere taking place on 29 June 1822.

Overall, the opera appears to have been well received and given twenty performances, although according to Donizetti, "it was half-ruined by a novice singer (Cecconi)". However, as has been noted, "the score contains an attractive speciality number for the dancing master, Flageolet, and an extended quartet, '', the one number of the work to be praised by critics after the premiere" because it avoided "those caballetas and that symmetrical repetition of motifs which obliges all the performers to repeat the same musical phrases no matter what the different emotions may agitate them".

Roles

Synopsis
Place: France
Time: 17th century

Countess Rosina and Captain Filinto are going to get married. An anonymous letter claiming that the Captain is already married to another arrives on the wedding day. This letter is finally found to be false, and the preparations for the wedding party continue.

Recordings

References
Notes

Cited sources
Ashbrook, William and Sarah Hibberd (2001), in  Holden, Amanda (Ed.), The New Penguin Opera Guide, New York: Penguin Putnam. .  pp. 224 – 247.
Osborne, Charles, The Bel Canto Operas of Rossini, Donizetti, and Bellini, Portland, Oregon: Amadeus Press, 1994 

Other sources
Allitt, John Stewart (1991), Donizetti: in the light of Romanticism and the teaching of Johann Simon Mayr, Shaftesbury: Element Books, Ltd (UK); Rockport, MA: Element, Inc.(USA)
Ashbrook, William (1982), Donizetti and His Operas, Cambridge University Press.  
Ashbrook, William (1998), "Donizetti, Gaetano" in Stanley Sadie  (Ed.),  The New Grove Dictionary of Opera, Vol. One. London: Macmillan Publishers, Inc.   
Black, John (1982), Donizetti’s Operas in Naples, 1822—1848. London: The Donizetti Society.
Loewenberg, Alfred (1970). Annals of Opera, 1597-1940, 2nd edition.  Rowman and Littlefield
Sadie, Stanley, (Ed.); John Tyrell (Exec. Ed.) (2004), The New Grove Dictionary of Music and Musicians.  2nd edition. London: Macmillan.    (hardcover).   (eBook).
 Weinstock, Herbert (1963), Donizetti and the World of Opera in Italy, Paris, and Vienna in the First Half of the Nineteenth Century, New York: Pantheon Books.

External links
  Donizetti Society (London) website

1822 operas
Operas set in the 17th century
Italian-language operas
Operas by Gaetano Donizetti
One-act operas
Operas
Operas based on plays
Operas based on works by Pierre Corneille
Operas set in France
Works about nobility